Wiesław Wysocki (born 1950) is a Polish historian specializing in modern Polish history, particularly the World War II era.

References

1950 births
20th-century Polish historians
Polish male non-fiction writers
Living people
Place of birth missing (living people)
21st-century Polish historians